Wills Point High School is a 4A high school located in Wills Point, Texas (USA). It is part of the Wills Point Independent School District located in northwestern Van Zandt County. Some students also attend from Kaufman County.   In 2011, the school was rated "Academically Acceptable" by the Texas Education Agency.

Athletics
The Wills Point Tigers compete in the following sports:

Cross Country, Volleyball, Football, Track, Basketball, Tennis, Softball, Golf, and Baseball

State Titles
1965 Football (1A)
1983 Boys Singles Tennis (Judd Sanderson)
1995 Girls Doubles Tennis (Sara Schreffler/Kelly Kay)
2018 Boys Doubles Tennis (Chase Daniell/Kash Adams)

School Band
The school band has placed top 10 in the UIL State Marching Contest for four years in a row under the direction of Nick Kornegay. The band has also had 21 consecutive UIL Sweepstakes and several members over the decade have placed in the All-State Band.

Media appearances
Wills Point High School has appeared on the reality series, The Principal's Office on truTV.

References

External links
 
 Wills Point ISD
 Wills Point Band

Schools in Van Zandt County, Texas
Public high schools in Texas